The Kanawha Madonna is a wood carving of a person holding a four-legged animal. The carving is part of the collection of the West Virginia State Museum and displayed in the Cultural Center as an example of prehistoric Native American wood carving. It was carved from the trunk of a honey locust tree. The base has a hole in the bottom, possibly for mounting on a pole.

Discovery
In 1897, four teenaged boys found the statue while exploring a cave set in a cliff above the lower New River, in Kanawha County, West Virginia. They found the statue under a large flat stone. A member of the West Virginia Historical and Antiquarian Society, Dr. John P. Hale acquired the statue. Hale visited the cave and presented a paper about the statue.

In 1964 a radiocarbon date put the statue's age at 350 years. A more recent radiocarbon dating estimates the wood to date from between 1440 and 1600 CE, although this does not mean it was carved at this time. It could have been carved at any time after this.

See also
 Prehistory of West Virginia
 Mississippian stone statuary

References

Pre-statehood history of West Virginia
Indigenous culture of the Northeastern Woodlands
Indigenous woodcarving of the Americas
Kanawha County, West Virginia
Wooden sculptures in West Virginia